Collington or Colington may refer to:

Places
 Collington Branch, a stream in Maryland
 Collington railway station on the south coast of England
 Collington Road, Maryland Route 197
 Collington, Herefordshire, a civil parish in England
 Collington, Maryland, a defunct settlement in the United States

Others
Collington (band), American indie rock band of James Collington
 USS Colington, various ships of the US Navy
 Colington Island, North Carolina, United States